Rituals is the twelfth full-length album by Greek extreme metal band Rotting Christ. It was released on 12 February 2016, via Season of Mist. The album debuted at number 14 on the Billboard heatseekers album chart and at number 10 on Ifpi Greek charts.

Track listing

Personnel

Rotting Christ
Sakis Tolis – vocals, guitars, bass, keyboards, production, mixing, mastering
Themis Tolis – drums

Additional personnel
Vagelis Karzis – backing vocals
George Emmanuel – backing vocals, lead guitar (track 3), recording
Manolis Antzoletakis – backing vocals
Giorgos Petratos – backing vocals
Theodoros Aivaliotis – vocals (choir)
Giannis Stamatakis – vocals (choir)
Babis Alexandropoulos – vocals (choir)
George Zacharopoulos – additional vocals (track 1)
Danai Katsameni – additional vocals (track 3)
Vorph – additional vocals (track 4)
Nick Holmes – additional vocals (track 7)
Kathir – additional vocals (track 9)	
Nikos Veletzas – percussion
George Anamouroglou – percussion
Fotis Benardo – percussion
Alexandros Kalfakis – percussion
Konstantis Mpistolis – bagpipes (tracks 3, 9)
Giorgos Nikas – bagpipes (tracks 3, 9)
Nikola Nikita Jeremić – orchestration (tracks 1, 7)

Production
Jens Bogren – mixing, mastering
Adrien Bousson – layout

Charts

References

Rotting Christ albums
2016 albums
Season of Mist albums